Keziah (Hebrew: קְצִיעָה Qəṣī‘ā; Greek: Κασία, Kasia; also Ketziah) is a woman in the Hebrew Bible. She was the second of the three daughters born to Job after his sufferings (Job 42:14). Her elder sister was Jemima and her younger sister Keren-Happuch.

The name Keziah means "restored to the heart of God" and references Job's restoration after the trials he faced in the first part of his life. The name has been taken to symbolize female equality, since all of Job's three daughters received an inheritance from their father, an unusual circumstance in a time period when women and men were not treated equally.

References

Book of Job people
Job (biblical figure)
Women in the Hebrew Bible